Melica pappiana is a species of grass found in China (Jilin and Shanxi).

Description
The leaf-sheaths have glabrous surface, are tubular, and are closed on one end. The main panicle branches are indistinct and almost racemose.

They also have fertile spikelets that have filiformed and pubescent pedicels. The spikelets have 2 fertile flores which are diminished at the apex while the sterile florets are barren, clumped and orbicular. Both the upper and lower glumes are keelless, lanceolate, membranous, and purple in colour. Its palea have ciliolated keels and is 2-veined. Flowers have 3 anthers while the fruits are caryopses and have additional pericarp as well.

References

pappiana
Grasses of China
Flora of Jilin
Flora of Shanxi